Norton Halt railway station was a station in Norton, Worcestershire, England. The station was opened in 1879 and closed in 1966.

References

Further reading

Disused railway stations in Worcestershire
Railway stations in Great Britain opened in 1879
Railway stations in Great Britain closed in 1966
Former Great Western Railway stations
Beeching closures in England